Turabay ibn Qaraja (ALA-LC: Ṭurābāy ibn Qarājǎ, and sometimes transliterated as Ṭarābāy ibn Qarājǎ) was the chieftain of the Banu Haritha tribesmen in northern Palestine and an Ottoman governor and tax farmer in the Marj Ibn Amer plain (Jezreel Valley). His career began under the Mamluks in the late 15th century and continued under the Ottomans who kept him in his post as commander of the roads connecting Damascus with Cairo and Jerusalem in 1516 and soon after appointed him governor of Safad. By 1538, he had been granted tax farms in Marj Ibn Amer, Qaqun and in the Ajlun region east of the Jordan River. Turabay's descendants, the Turabay dynasty, continued to hold influence in Marj Ibn Amer as the hereditary governors of Lajjun until 1677.

Biography
Turabay belonged to the Banu Haritha tribe, which claimed descent from the powerful Tayy tribe, whose sub-branches had long-dominated the regions of Syria and northern Arabia. During the late Mamluk period in the 15th century, the Banu Haritha were semi-nomadic Bedouin and inhabited the rural hinterlands of Nablus in northern Palestine. Turabay's father, Qaraja, was appointed by the Mamluks as chieftain of the Marj Ibn Amer plain north of Nablus. Turabay succeeded Qaraja after the latter was killed in 1480. Though they were Arabs, both Qaraja and Turabay were non-Arabic Mamluk names.

The Mamluks lost Syria to the Ottomans after the Battle of Marj Dabiq in 1516. Turabay defected to the Ottoman sultan Selim I, who reaffirmed Turabay's position in Marj Ibn Amer, including his post as amir al-darbayn (commander of the two roads i.e. Damascus–Cairo and Damascus–Jerusalem). Selim and Turabay maintained cordial relations. Selim informed Turabay of his victory over the Mamluks at the Battle of Raydaniyya in Cairo and commanded him to arrest fugitive Mamluks escaping Egypt through Turabay's territory; senior emirs were to be handed over to the Ottomans in Egypt, while regular soldiers were to be executed. When Selim departed Damascus for the Ottoman capital, Constantinople, in 1518, Turabay was among the dignitaries who bade him farewell. By then, Turabay had been appointed the sanjak-bey (district governor) of Safad Sanjak.

During the revolt of the governor of Damascus, Janbirdi al-Ghazali, against Selim, Turabay backed the Ottomans. Pro-Janbirdi Bedouin attacked the tribesmen of Turabay in the vicinity of Nablus, capturing their horses and camels. After the revolt was stamped out, Turabay's status rose, and the Ottomans granted him more territory. In 1531/32, Turabay constructed the fortress of al-Ukhaydir on the Hajj pilgrimage route, on the orders of Mustafa Pasha, governor of Damascus Eyalet (Province of Damascus). The fort was built to deter the often-rebellious tribesmen of Banu Lam and Banu Uqbah from harassing the Hajj pilgrims.

Ottoman registers from 1538 indicate the extent of Turabay's political authority in Damascus Eyalet; he was listed as the timar-holder (akin to tax farmer) of the villages of Marj Ibn Amer in Lajjun Sanjak, the nahiya (subdistrict) of Qaqun in Nablus Sanjak and the nahiyas of Banu Kinanah, Banu Atiyya and Banu Juhmah in Ajlun Sanjak east of the Jordan River. He was also entrusted with supervising the nahiya of al-Ghawr in Ajlun Sanjak. Following Turabay's death (year unknown), his clan, the Turabay dynasty, were in rebellion for unknown reasons. By 1559, however, the clan's circumstances stabilized, and Turabay's son Ali was appointed sanjak-bey of Lajjun Sanjak, which consisted of the Marj Ibn Amer, lower Galilee and the hills around Jenin. Turabay's other son, Assaf, succeeded Ali circa 1571 and governed Lajjun for over a decade. Members of the clan continued to rule Lajjun as a hereditary post until they were replaced by an Ottoman officer in 1677.

References

Bibliography

16th-century Arabs
16th-century people from the Ottoman Empire
History of Safed
Arabs from the Ottoman Empire
Ottoman Palestine
Political people from the Ottoman Empire
15th-century people from the Mamluk Sultanate
Bedouin tribal chiefs